Queen Swanapali (or Swarnamali Devi) was the spouse of King Pandukabhaya of Anuradhapura, Sri Lanka. She was the daughter of prince Girikandasiva, a powerful son of King Panduvasdeva with eight brothers. When she first met Prince Pandukabhaya, she was serving food at a paddy field. She served food to Pandukabhaya on a Lotus leaf, and the leaf turned golden. Because of this incident, princess Pali came to be known as Swarnapali.(swarna=gold)

See also
Mahavamsa
History of Sri Lanka

House of Vijaya